Ernst Traxel (born 23 November 1933) is a Swiss former professional racing cyclist. He rode in three editions of the Tour de France.

References

External links
 

1933 births
Living people
Swiss male cyclists
People from the canton of Uri
Tour de Suisse stage winners